Streptomonospora is a Gram-positive and aerobic bacterial genus from the family of Nocardiopsaceae.

References

Further reading 
 
 

Actinomycetales
Bacteria genera